Alangium rotundifolium is a tree in the family Cornaceae. The specific epithet  is from the Latin meaning "rounded leaves".

Description
The smooth to scaly bark is white to pale grey. The fragrant flowers are white or cream to yellow. The ovate-ellipsoid fruits are reddish when ripe.

Distribution and habitat
Alangium rotundifolium grows naturally in Sumatra, Peninsular Malaysia, Java and Borneo.

References

rotundifolium
Trees of Malesia
Plants described in 1859